The 2017 Patriot League men's soccer tournament, was the 28th edition of the tournament. It determined the Patriot League's automatic berth into the 2017 NCAA Division I Men's Soccer Championship.

The tournament was won by Colgate Raiders, who qualified for the tournament on the last day of the regular season as the sixth and final seed in the tournament. Colgate were also the defending champions, and were able to capture their seventh Patriot League Tournament championship, tying them with Lafayette. En route to the final, Colgate upset third-seed Bucknell and top seed Loyola. In the final, a 67th minute striker from Oliver Harris sealed the title for the Raiders against Holy Cross.

With the championship, Colgate earned an automatic berth into the 2017 NCAA Tournament. There they made a run to the Sweet Sixteen, upsetting No. 24 UMass and No. 13 Michigan along the way. Colgate ultimately fell to Louisville.

Seeding 

The top six programs qualified for the Patriot League Tournament.

Bracket

Results

First round

Semifinals

Final

Awards

References 

2017
Patriot League Men's Soccer